Juliana Kakraba (born 29 December 1979) is a Ghanaian former footballer who played as a midfielder for the Ghana women's national football team.

Career
During her club football career, she played for Ghatel Ladies in Ghana.

Kakraba was a member of the Ghana women's national football team. She was included in the team's squad for the 1999 FIFA Women's World Cup in the United States.

References

External links
 
 
 

1979 births
Living people
Ghanaian women's footballers
Ghana women's international footballers
Place of birth missing (living people)
1999 FIFA Women's World Cup players
Women's association football midfielders